Eckstine is a surname. Notable people with the surname include:

Billy Eckstine (1914–1993), ballad singer and bandleader during the Swing era
Guy Eckstine, American music industry executive
Ronnie Eckstine (born 1946), American actor and music manager, stepson of Billy

See also
Eckstein
Eksteen